Viv is a unisex given name, often a short form (hypocorism) of Vivian or Vivienne or variations thereof. It may refer to:

People

Women
 Viv Albertine (born 1954), British singer and songwriter
 Viv Nicholson (1936–2015), British woman who went on spending sprees when her second husband won the football pools
 Viv Stephens (born 1953), New Zealand cricketer

Men
 Viv Allen (1916–1995), Canadian hockey player
 Viv Anderson (born 1956), English football coach and player
 Viv Bingham (1932–2012), British political activist and president of the Liberal Party
 Viv Busby (born 1949), British football player and manager
 Viv Dunn (1895–1974), Australian rugby union player
 Viv Farnsworth (1889–1953), Australian rugby league player
 Vivian Gibbins (1901–1979), English amateur footballer
 Viv Harrison (1921–1989), Welsh rugby union and rugby league player
 Viv Huzzey (1876–1929), Welsh rugby union and baseball player
 Vivian Jenkins (1911–2004), Welsh rugby union player and sports journalist
 Viv Michie (born 1992), Australian rules footballer
 Viv Parkinson (1882–1944), Australian rules footballer
 Viv Peterson (born 1942), Australian rules footballer
 Viv Prince (born 1941), English drummer
 Viv Randall (1914–1985), Australian rules footballer
 Viv Richards (born 1952), West Indian cricketer
 Viv Solomon-Otabor (born 1996), English footballer
 Viv Thicknesse (1910–1986), Australian rugby league and rugby union player
 Viv Thomas (born 1948), British pornographer
 Viv Valentine (1887–1967), Australian rules footballer
 Viv Woodward (Welsh footballer), Welsh footballer

Female fictional characters
 Viv Hope, on the British soap opera Emmerdale
 Vivian Johnson, on the American crime drama series Without a Trace
 Viv Newton, on the Australian soap opera Home and Away
 Viv Vision, a Marvel Comics android

English unisex given names
Unisex given names
Hypocorisms